Hex of Infinite Binding is an EP by the Mountain Goats, self-released online on September 7, 2018.

Reception
In their review, online music magazine Pitchfork gave Hex of Infinite Binding a score of 7.4/10.

Track listing

Personnel 
John Darnielle - guitars, vocals, possibly some keyboard 
Matt Douglas - woodwinds, vocals, harmony vocals, probably some keyboard
Matt Espy - percussion (“Almost Every Door” and “Song for Ted Sallis”) 
Chris Stamey - electric guitar, bass guitar, and string arrangement (“Hospital Reaction Shot”) 
Leah Gibson - cello (“Hospital Reaction Shot”) 
Aubrey Keisel - viola and violin (“Hospital Reaction Shot”) 
Jon Wurster - drums and percussion (“Hospital Reaction Shot”)

Charts

References

External links 
Bandcamp "Hex of Infinite Binding" Page

2018 albums
The Mountain Goats EPs